Dhadkan is a 2017 Indian Bhojpuri action-romance-comedy film written by Veeru Thakur, Manoj kr Kushwaha & directed by Sujeet Kumar Singh. Produced and distributed by Dhupendra Bhagat, Kishori film Productions & Wave Music respectively, the film features Pawan Singh and Akshara Singh in lead roles while Shikha Mishra, Ayaz Khan, Nidhi Jha and Umesh Singh portray pivotal roles. The soundtrack and film score were composed by Madhukar Anand & Chhote Baba. Sanjay Korbe, Ram Devan was the film's cinematographer and editing was done by Dipak Jaul.

Cast
 Pawan Singh as Raja
 Akshara Singh as Gulabo
Shikha Mishra  as Rani
 Ayaz Khan as Kali
 Umesh Singh
 Nidhi Jha - Special appearance in a song Khaibu ka Katahal

References

Indian action comedy films
2010s Bhojpuri-language films
2017 action comedy films